Boomerang Glacier is a gently curving glacier,  long, draining southward from Mount Dickason in the Deep Freeze Range to enter Browning Pass, at the north side of the Nansen Ice Sheet in Victoria Land. It was discovered by the Northern Party of the British Antarctic Expedition, 1910–13, and so named by them because of its boomerang-like shape.

References 

Glaciers of Borchgrevink Coast